Nupserha nyassensis is a species of beetle in the family Cerambycidae. It was described by Per Olof Christopher Aurivillius in 1914.

Varietas
 Nupserha nyassensis var. bioccipitalis Breuning, 1950
 Nupserha nyassensis var. tanganyicae Breuning, 1958
 Nupserha nyassensis var. compacta Breuning, 1949

References

nyassensis
Beetles described in 1914